Petr Pololáník is a Czech conductor, orchestrator and music producer. His father Zdeněk Pololáník belongs to foremost Czech composers.

Petr studied both violin, piano and conducting; in 1996, he earned his Master of Arts in conducting at the Janacek Academy of Music and Performing Arts in Brno.

Since 1996, Petr has been teaching at the Church Conservatory in Kroměříž, the Film School in Zlín and at the International Conductors Workshops in Kroměříž. In 2001, he became the Executive and artistic director of the Karlovy Vary Symphony Orchestra, one of the oldest symphony orchestras in Europe.

As a conductor, he has cooperated with leading orchestras, choirs and opera houses in Czech and abroad, and made several dozens of concert appearances and recordings for film, TV, radio, world known soloists and groups, production companies as well as sample libraries.

He is the founder and President of Capellen Music Production and conductor & orchestrator of the industry renowned Capellen Orchestra & Choir.

Discography
 Janacek: Works for Strings (1996); conductor
 Bohuslav Martinu: Cello Concertos (1999); conductor
 Gary Garritan: Qualities (2000); conductor, orchestrator
 Andrew B. Waggoner: Legacy (2001); conductor
 Beijing Rocks (2001); conductor, orchestrator
 Becoming Sammi (2002); conductor
 Womyn's Work (2003); conductor
 Star Runner (2003); conductor, orchestrator
 Gary Daverne: Gallipoli (2004); conductor
 The Dark Secret (2004); conductor, orchestrator
 Symphony of Enchanted Lands II – The Dark Secret (2004); conductor, orchestrator
 Erden Bilgen Plays Gallipoli (2004); conductor
 Eberhard Boettcher: Per Orchestra (2005); conductor
 Timothy J. Brown: Infinity (2005); conductor
 Nobles (2005); composer, arranger
 Triumph or Agony (2006); conductor, orchestrator
 Becoming Sammi + My Left Eye Sees Ghosts (2006); conductor
 Sons of Odin (2006); conductor, orchestrator
 Michal David: Love Songs (2006); arranger, music producer
 Dynasty (2007); conductor, orchestrator
 Angelique (2007); arranger, music producer
 Completely yours...Sammi (2006); conductor
 Florencio Asenjo: Angels Dancing On A Pin (2007); score supervisor, sound editor
 Legend (2008); conductor, orchestrator
 Storm Rider Clash of the Evils (2008); conductor, orchestrator
 The Devil Wears Nada (2009); conductor, orchestrator
 Three Kingdoms: Resurrection of the Dragon (2009); conductor, orchestrator
 Power of Darkness (2010); conductor, orchestrator
 Invincible (2010); conductor, orchestrator
 Echoes of the Rainbow (2010); conductor, orchestrator
 The Stool Pigeon (film) (2010); conductor, orchestrator
 Vendetta (2011); conductor, orchestrator
 The Human Experience (2011); conductor, orchestrator
 Illusions (2011); conductor, orchestrator
 Nero (2011); conductor, orchestrator
 White Vengeance (2011); conductor, orchestrator
 Two Steps From Heaven (2012); conductor, orchestrator
 Elysium (2012); conductor, orchestrator
 Archangel (2012); conductor, orchestrator
 SkyWorld (2012); conductor, orchestrator
 Awakenings (2012); conductor, orchestrator
 Gitano (2012); conductor

Filmography
 Return to foreign country (1994); score reader
 Jack the rubber (1998); composer
 Scaramouche (1923/2000); orchestrator
 Beijing Rocks (2001); conductor, orchestrator
 Star Runner (2003); conductor, orchestrator
 Traces of a Dragon (2003); conductor, orchestrator
 The Day the Earth Shook - The Absolute Power (2006); conductor
 Angelique (2007); arranger, music producer
 Storm Rider Clash of the Evils (2008); conductor, orchestrator
 The Human Experience (2008); conductor, orchestrator
 The Sniper (2009 film) (2009); conductor, orchestrator
 Three Kingdoms: Resurrection of the Dragon (2009); conductor, orchestrator
 The Road Less Travelled (2010); conductor, orchestrator
 Fire of Conscience (2010); conductor, orchestrator
 Future X-Cops (2010); conductor, orchestrator
 14 Blades (2010); conductor, orchestrator
 The Tudors (2010); conductor, orchestrator
 The Pillars of the Earth (TV miniseries) (2010); conductor, orchestrator
 The Stool Pigeon (film) (2010); conductor, orchestrator
 The Lost Bladesman (2011); conductor, orchestrator
 Lee's Adventure (2011); conductor, orchestrator
 White Vengeance (2011); conductor, orchestrator
 The Four (film) (2012); conductor, orchestrator
 Prophecy (2012); conductor, orchestrator

Tour performances
 Meeting of Two Worlds (2002); arranger, conductor
 Meeting of Two Worlds II. (2004); arranger, conductor
 Demons, Dragons And Warriors Tour (2005); conductor
 Demons, Dragons And Warriors World Tour (2007); conductor
 Music from the Silver Screen (2009–10); arranger, conductor
 Elysium - The Xmas Fantasy (2012); arranger, conductor, producer
 Two Steps From Hell in Concert Live (2013); orchestrator, conductor

Other projects
 The Great Theatre of the World (theatre production; 1995); composer, music producer
 Misantrop (theatre production; 1997); composer
 Crime and Punishment (theatre production; 1997); arranger; music producer
 The Eagle with Two Heads (theatre production; 1998); arranger; music producer
 The Goaty Sing (theatre production; 1998); arranger; music producer
 Passion Games (theatre production; 2000); arranger; music producer
 The Merchant of Venice (theatre production; 2000); arranger; music producer
 Garritan Personal Orchestra (sample library; 2003-); recording producer
 SimCity 4: Rush Hour (computer game, 2004); conductor
 Garritan World Instruments (sample library; 2010); recording producer
 Tutti (orchestral FX library; 2011); conductor, consultant, contractor
 Vivace (orchestral FX library; 2011); conductor, consultant, contractor
 Garritan Classic Pipe Organs (sample library; 2012); consultant, recording producer
 DaCapo (sample library; 2012); conductor, consultant, contractor
 Tiara Concerto (online game, 2012); conductor, orchestrator
 Transformers: Fall of Cybertron (computer game, 2012); conductor, orchestrator
 Company Of Heroes 2 (computer game, 2012); conductor, orchestrator
 Minimal (sample library; 2013); conductor, consultant, contractor

References

External links 
 
 GPO Orchestration Competition
 Vendetta: Behind the Scenes (video documentary)
 Journey to Elysium: Making of "Elysium" (video documentary)

1973 births
Living people
Czech conductors (music)
Male conductors (music)
Musicians from Brno
21st-century conductors (music)
21st-century Czech male musicians